The 2001 Copa Constitució was the 10th season of Andorra's national football knockout tournament.

Results

First round
Fifteen teams entered this round, eight from 2000–01 Primera Divisió and seven from 2000–01 Segona Divisió. 

|}

Quarterfinals

|}

Semifinals
The matches were played on 31 May 2001.

|}

Final
The match were played on 3 June 2001.

References

External links
Results at RSSSF

Copa Constitució seasons
Andorra
Copa